Lijomol Jose  is an Indian actress, who primarily appears in Malayalam and Tamil films. She is famous for portraying Senggeni in the Tamil film Jai Bhim  along with Suriya, which won her Filmfare Award for Best Actress - Tamil at the 67th Filmfare Awards South.

Career 
Lijomol made her acting debut in the highly acclaimed Malayalam film, Maheshinte Prathikaaram in 2016. She then played the second female lead in the commercially successful film Kattappanayile Rithwik Roshan in the same year. In her third film, Honey Bee 2.5 (2017), she played the role of a personal make-up artist of actress Bhavana. She then starred in Street Lights (2018) with Mammootty before making her Tamil cinema debut with Sivappu Manjal Pachai (2019) opposite Siddharth.  Jose was critically acclaimed for portraying the anguish of a primitive Irular tribe, Senggeni in Jai Bhim, co-starring actor Suriya.

Personal life 
Lijomol Jose married Arun Antony Onisseril on 4 October 2021, in Wayanad, Kerala.

Filmography

Awards and nominations

References

External links
 

Living people
Year of birth missing (living people)
21st-century Indian actresses
Actresses in Malayalam cinema
Actresses in Malayalam television
Actresses in Tamil cinema
Indian film actresses
Indian television actresses